Judo Canada, formerly known as The Canadian Kodokan Black Belt Association, is the non-profit national governing body of the Japanese martial art and combat sport Judo in Canada, and a federation of Judo associations in each of the ten provinces and three territories. It was incorporated in 1956 and recognized by the International Judo Federation in 1958.

See also
Judo in Canada
List of Canadian judoka

References

Further reading
 Official history of Judo in Canada that includes a history of Judo Canada as an organization, now freely accessible through Google Books.

External links
Judo Canada (official website)
List of provincial and territorial Judo associations (Judo Canada)
Judo Canada Hall of Fame (Judo Canada)

Canada
Judo in Canada
Sports governing bodies in Canada
1956 establishments in Ontario
National members of the International Judo Federation
Sports organizations established in 1956